Ramesh Chandra (born 1939) is the founder Indian Real estate company Unitech.

Early life and education
Ramesh Chandra, was born in 1941 to a banker, and spent his formative years in Farrukhabad, a town in Uttar Pradesh. After finishing his schooling there, he joined IIT Kharagpur, where he studied structural engineering.

Career
After completing a short stint at the Bridge and Roof Company in Kolkata post his graduation, he left to major in Structural Engineering at the University of Southampton in England. However, along with four of his friends, he started the United Technical Consultant Private Ltd., primarily a soil investigation company, in Delhi. He used to have net worth over $11 billion at his peak in 2007, but fell into trouble after it got embroiled in a telecom corruption scandal.

He moved into real estate and civil engineering in 1985 to build middle-class homes and completed many prestigious projects in Gurgaon, UP, and Libya, among other middle-eastern countries. His publicly traded company, the Unitech Group  The company is now largely under the management of two sons — Ajay Chandra and Sanjay Chandra with latter being in charge of Unitech Wireless. In 2011, Sanjay Chandra was implicated in the 2G spectrum case and was arrested by the Central Bureau of Investigation. Ramesh Chandra was jailed on 11 January 2016 on charges of cheating.

Personal life
He is married to Pushpa Chandra, and has two children — Ajay Chandra and Sanjay Chandra.

References

External links
 Unitech Group website
Money Control
Ramesh Chandra; Forbes
The Financial Express

Indian billionaires
20th-century births
Living people
IIT Kharagpur alumni
People from Delhi
Businesspeople from Delhi
People from Farrukhabad
2G spectrum case
Year of birth missing (living people)
People charged with corruption